Pelenato Fuluhea, also known as Pulufegu, was a king of Uvea, ruling from 1947 until 1950.  He was preceded by Leone Manikitoga, and succeeded by Kapeliele Tufele III.

Wallis and Futuna monarchs
Oceanian monarchs